Rosalin Dipannita Martin (Popularly known as Deepanwita Martin) is a Bangladeshi actress. She won Bangladesh National Film Award for Best Actress for her role in the film 
Gor (The Grave) (2020).

Works

References

External links
 

Living people
Bangladeshi film actresses
Best Actress National Film Awards (Bangladesh) winners
Place of birth missing (living people)
Date of birth missing (living people)
Year of birth missing (living people)
Bangladeshi television actresses
21st-century Bangladeshi actresses